Probable DNA dC->dU-editing enzyme APOBEC-3B is a protein that in humans is encoded by the APOBEC3B gene.

This gene is a member of the cytidine deaminase gene family. It is one of seven related genes or pseudogenes found in a cluster, thought to result from gene duplication, on chromosome 22. Members of the cluster encode proteins that are structurally and functionally related to the C to U RNA-editing cytidine deaminase APOBEC1. It is thought that the proteins may be RNA editing enzymes and have roles in growth or cell cycle control. This gene along with APOBEC3A have been in recent years found associated with mutagenesis of several cancers. The APOBEC3A and APOBEC3B proteins can cause specific mutations in cancer genomes called APOBEC mutagenesis and several factors including genetic and environmental influence this mutation pattern among patients specifically in bladder and breast cancer. This gene is also overexpressed in multiple myeloma, possibly aiding its formation.

References

External links

Further reading

 An APOBEC cytidine deaminase mutagenesis pattern is widespread in human cancers

Steven A Roberts,	Michael S Lawrence,	Leszek J Klimczak,	Sara A Grimm,	David Fargo, Petar Stojanov,	Adam Kiezun,	Gregory V Kryukov,	Scott L Carter,	Gordon Saksena,	Shawn Harris,	Ruchir R Shah,	Michael A Resnick,	Gad Getz	& Dmitry A Gordenin

Candace D Middlebrooks, A Rouf Banday, Konichi Matsuda, et al. Association of germline variants in the APOBEC3 region with cancer risk and enrichment with APOBEC-signature mutations in tumors Exit Disclaimer. Nature Genetics 2016.